The 1962 Ball State Cardinals football team was an American football team that represented Ball State College (later renamed Ball State University) in the Indiana Collegiate Conference (ICC) during the 1962 NCAA College Division football season. In its first season under head coach Ray Louthen, the team compiled a 4–3–1 record (2–3–1 against ICC opponents) and finished in sixth place out of seven teams in the ICC. 

Sophomore halfback Merv Rettenmund later played Major League Baseball.

Schedule

References

Ball State
Ball State Cardinals football seasons
Ball State Cardinals football